Tamara Leitner (born July 3, 1972) is an American network correspondent and investigative TV reporter. The journalist won a George Foster Peabody and Edward R. Murrow for the documentary Toxic Secrets. She also won 12 Emmys for investigative news stories and co-founded Volition Films with Dr. Jordan Schaul.

Education
Leitner graduated from the University of California, Los Angeles with a bachelor's degree in English, before eventually completing her master's degree in journalism from Boston University in Massachusetts.

Career 
She established her reputation as a hard-nosed journalist, writing for newspapers in New York and Arizona, including the New York Post. Leitner was honored by the Associated Press Managing Editors for stories she did when she was a police reporter for the East Valley Tribune in Mesa, Arizona.

As a journalist, Leitner has burst into a burning building, worked as a member of a NASCAR pit crew, gone one-on-one with trained attack dogs and volunteered to be shot by a Taser. Leitner has earned multiple awards in Arizona and New York for crime reporting, including Arizona Press Club Awards for coverage of a serial rapist, the Arizona angle on the Sept. 11, 2001 terrorist attacks, and legendary mob informant Sammy "The Bull" Gravano's arrest in Arizona. She was also honored in 1999 by the city of Scottsdale, Ariz., for saving a drowning man.

Leitner joined the news staff of KPHO, the CBS affiliate in Phoenix, Arizona, as a crime reporter on September 3, 2002. She has won twelve Rocky Mountain Emmy Awards - the first in 2004 for a piece she did on Maricopa County Sheriff Joe Arpaio's notorious tent city, the second in 2006 for a breaking news story, her third in 2007 for continuing coverage of an investigative story, and her fourth and fifth for a weeklong series called "Assault on Arizona", which focused on crime and illegal immigration issues at the Arizona-Mexico border. Leitner has 19 Rocky Mountain Emmy nominations to her credit.

Leitner joined WCBS-TV in New York City as an investigative reporter in June 2013.  Leitner joined WMAQ-TV in Chicago in March 2014 as an investigative reporter.   Leitner joined NBC Nightly News in early June, 2016.  Leitner is currently a contributor with MSNBC's The Rachel Maddow Show.

Survivor 
Leitner was a participant in the 4th edition of the reality TV-program Survivor, which was filmed in late 2001 and aired in 2002. She was the tenth contestant voted off, gaining 7th place and lasting 30 of 39 days and winning two individual immunity challenges.

Tammy Leitner was awarded the "Sue Hawk Award" for her speech "Hypocrites" during the Reunion episode of Survivor: Marquesas.

Personal life 
Leitner is also an accomplished athlete and a member of PowerBar Team Elite. She finished first in her division at the 2007 Subaru Women's Triathlon in San Diego, second to Survivor castmate Gina Crews in the celebrity division of the 2006 Nautica Malibu Triathlon, third in her division at the 2008 Las Palomas triathlon and fourth in her division at the 2007 Santa Barbara Triathlon.

References

External links 

 Tammy Leitner biography for Survivor: Marquesas at CBS.com
 Tammy Leitner biography at KPHO-TV

American television reporters and correspondents
American women television journalists
NBC News people
MSNBC people
Survivor (American TV series) contestants
1972 births
Living people